Like in other nations across the world, there are several far-right organizations and parties operating in Poland.

History and ideology

Past 

An important element of Polish nationalism has been its identification with the Roman Catholic religion with its roots in the counter-reformation of the 17th century, and one that became established clearly in the interwar period. Although the old Commonwealth was religiously diverse and highly tolerant, the Roman Catholic religious element with messianic undertones (the Christ of Nations) became one of the defining characteristics of the modern Polish identity. Roman Dmowski, a Polish politician of that era, was vital in defining that concept, and has been called the "father of Polish nationalism." Dmowski was the leader of National Democracy. After his death, more radically inclined youth broke off and created the  National Radical Camp.

Modern 

Following the collapse of a communist system in the country, the far-right ideology became visible. The pan-Slavic and neopagan Polish National Union (PWN-PSN) political party at its peak was one of the larger groups active in the early 1990s, numbering then some 4,000 members and making international headlines for its anti-Semitism and anti-Catholicism. The National Revival of Poland being a marginal political party, under the leadership of Adam Gmurczyk, operates since the late 1980s. It is a member of European National Front and a co-founder of International Third Position. The organization Association for Tradition and Culture "Niklot" was founded in 1998 by Tomasz Szczepanski, a former NOP member, promoting Slavic supremacy and neopaganism. Since the mid-1990s, the ultra-Catholic Radio Maryja station has been on air with an anti-modernist, nationalist and xenophobic program. All-Polish Youth and National Radical Camp were "recreated" in 1989 and 1993, respectively becoming Poland's most prominent far-right organizations.

In 1995, the Anti-Defamation League estimated the number of far-right skinheads in Poland at 2,000, the fifth highest number after Germany, Hungary, the Czech Republic and the United States. Since the late 2000s, native White power skinhead, White supremacy and Neo-Nazi groups largely were absorbed into more casual and better organized "Autonomous Nationalists".

On the political level, the biggest victories achieved so far by the far-right were in the 2001, 2005, 2015, and 2019 elections. The League of Polish Families won 38 seats in 2001, and 34 in 2005. In 2015, entering parliament from the list of Kukiz'15, the far-right National Movement gained 5 seats out of Kukiz's 42. In April 2016 National Movement leadership decided to break-off with Kukiz's movement, but only one MP followed the party's instructions. The ones that decided to stay with Kukiz'15, together with few other Kukiz's MPs, formed parliamentary nationalist association called "National Democracy" (Endecja). In 2019, the Confederation had the best performance of any far-right coalition to date, earning 1,256,953 votes which was 6.81% of the total vote in an election that saw a historically high turnout. Together the coalition (although de jure a party) earned 11 seats, 5 for KORWiN, 5 for National Movement, and 1 for Confederation of the Polish Crown.

Members of far-right groups make up a significant portion of those taking part in the annual "Independence March" in central Warsaw, which started in 2009, to mark Independence Day. About 60,000 were in the 2017 march marking the 99th anniversary of independence, with placards such as "Clean Blood" seen on the march.

Examples of influence

Islamophobia 
There have been reports of hate crimes targeting Muslim minority in Poland. Far-right and right-wing populist political parties and organizations fuel fear and hatred towards Islam and Muslims. Hate crimes such as arson and physical violence have occurred in Poland (despite having a Muslim population of only 0.1%, that is 30,000 out of 38 million). Politicians have also made racist and anti-Muslim comments when discussing European migrant crisis; in 2015, Jarosław Kaczyński claimed that Poland "can't" accept any refugees because "they could spread infectious diseases." In 2017, the First Deputy Minister of Justice Patryk Jaki stated that "stopping Islamization is his Westerplatte".

After the 2015 elections 
In May 2016, despite criticism from human rights NGOs, opposition parties and left-wing organizations, of the appeasement of the far-right, the right-wing government of Law and Justice (PiS) disbanded governmental advisory and coordinating body that dealt with "racial discrimination, xenophobia and related to them, intolerance" (Rada ds. Przeciwdziałania Dyskryminacji Rasowej, Ksenofobii i związanej z nimi Nietolerancji), by claiming that its mission was "useless".

See also
 Political parties in Poland
 Politics of Poland
 Confederation (political party)

References

Bibliography
 Ronnie Ferguson, Luciano Cheles, Michalina Vaughan (eds.) The Far Right in Western and Eastern Europe, Longman (1995), .
 David Ost, "The Radical Right in Poland", chapter 5 in: The Radical Right in Central and Eastern Europe Since 1989 (1999), .
 Christina Schori Liang, Europe for the Europeans: The Foreign and Security Policy of the Populist, Ashgate Publishing (2007), .

External links
 The Left Wing, the Far Right and the Kaczynskis Der Spiegel (2007)
 Letter from Europe: Shaping the agenda of Poland's drift to the far right International Herald Tribune (2007)
 Poland's populist government let far-right extremism explode into mainstream Vice News (2017)

 
Far-right politics in Europe
Poland